Kongarahalli  is a village in the southern state of Karnataka, India. It is located in the Kollegal taluk of Chamarajanagar district.

Demographics
 India census, Kongarahalli had a population of 8329 with 4052 males and 4277 females.

See also
 Chamarajanagar
 Districts of Karnataka

References

External links
 http://Chamarajanagar.nic.in/

Villages in Chamarajanagar district